The Karbala provincial headquarters raid was a special operation carried out on January 20, 2007, by The Mahdi army, on the U.S. contingent of the Joint Security Station located within the Iraqi Police headquarters. The assault, which left five U.S. soldiers dead and three wounded, has been called the "boldest and most sophisticated attack in four years of warfare" and is furthermore notable for being one of the few instances when any sort of militants or insurgents have actually managed to capture U.S. soldiers since the Vietnam War.

Background
Since the 2003 US invasion of Iraq, Karbala province had not seen the same intensity of violence that had wracked other areas of Iraq such as Baghdad and Al Anbar province.  Although Karbala had been the site of many attacks, it had largely been free of the spectacular bombings that regularly took place in Baghdad or the heavy urban warfare seen in Fallujah, Mosul, Baqubah, Ramadi, and elsewhere.  There were two notable exceptions: the March 2004 Ashura massacre and the uprising of Muqtada al-Sadr's Mahdi Army across southern Iraq the following month.  Prior to the 20 January raid, only 33 Coalition soldiers had been killed in Karbala province, constituting just over 1% of total coalition fatalities in Iraq.

The raid
The attack was perpetrated by "nine to 12 militants posing as an American security team ... [who] traveled in black GMC Suburban vehicles — the type used by U.S. government convoys — had American weapons, wore new U.S. military combat fatigues, and spoke English." According to one Iraqi official, the militant team was led by a blond-haired man. The attack occurred as the U.S. military continued preparations to leave. About 30 U.S. troops were inside the compound at the time.

After being waved through the last of three checkpoints manned by Iraqi security forces at around 17:45, the militants parked their (at least) five SUVs
near the city's Provisional Joint Coordination Center (PJCC) main building. The attackers' convoy divided upon arrival, with some vehicles parking at the back of the main building others parking in front.  The commandos first used homemade explosive to burn the two Security Vehicles outside.  Then they entered the building using fragmentation grenades in an attempt to isolate the two officers.  They then stormed into a room the Americans used as a barracks room, attacking with  grenades and small arms fire.  Once the soldiers in the room were isolated they proceeded to capture two U.S. soldiers, 1LT Jacob Noel Fritz and CPT Brian Scott Freeman. They pulled two more soldiers, PFC Shawn Patrick Falter and SPC Jonathan Bryan Chism out of an armored humvee at the entrance.  One soldier, PVT Jonathon Miles Millican, died by jumping on a grenade: which allowed the other three to only be wounded when the grenade thrown by insurgents exploded in the barracks room on the first floor of the building. Three U.S. humvees were damaged by separate explosions in the raid.  No Iraqi policemen or soldiers were injured in the raid, as the insurgents specifically targeted the U.S. soldiers in the compound.

At approximately 18:00, the insurgents broke off the attack and left the compound with their prisoners, heading east toward neighbouring Babil province. Shortly after crossing the Euphrates River, the militants, who were then being followed by U.S. attack helicopters, shot their four captives and abandoned five vehicles along with uniforms, equipment, and a rifle. Three soldiers were found later by Iraqi police with gunshot wounds to their chests near Bu-Alwan, a village close to Mahawil. Three were already dead (two handcuffed together in the back of one of the SUVs and the other on the ground) and the fourth showed up at nearby hospital with a gunshot wound to the head. On the day of the attack, the U.S. military reported only that five soldiers were killed while "repelling the attack." The full details of the attack, including the militants' penetration of the PJCC compound and the capture of four of the five soldiers, were not released until a week later.

Aftermath and analysis
Four individuals suspected of participating in the raid were detained on January 22 by U.S. troops and Iraqi security forces.

The mastermind behind the attack, Azhar al-Dulaimi, was killed on May 18 by U.S. forces during a raid north of Baghdad.

Evidence of Iranian involvement

According to two unnamed U.S. officials, the Pentagon is examining the possibility that the raid was supported or conducted by Iranians. In a speech on January 31, 2007, Iraqi Prime Minister Nouri al-Maliki stated that Iran was supporting attacks against Coalition forces in Iraq and some Iraqis suspect that the raid may have been perpetrated by the Islamic Revolutionary Guard Corps's Qods Force in retaliation for the U.S. raid on the Iranian Liaison Office in Erbil on 11 January.

In response to such speculations, Hassan Kazemi Qomi, the Iranian ambassador to Iraq, "ridiculed evidence the U.S. military claimed to have proving Iranian involvement in planning attacks on U.S. and Iraqi forces."

Journalist Bill Roggio has suggested that the attackers may have intended to transfer the captured Americans over the border to Iran.

On July 2, 2007, the U.S. military said that information from captured Hezbollah fighter Ali Musa Daqduq established a link between Quds Force and the Karbala raid. Daqduq worked as a liaison between Quds force and the Shia group that carried out the raid. According to the United States, Daqduq said that the Shia group "could not have conducted this complex operation without the support and direction of the Quds force."

On June 9, 2007, Bill Roggio of the Long War Journal wrote that U.S. Government had discovered satellite imagery showing an exact mockup of the Karbala Provincial Joint Coordination Center compound inside of Iran. It is believed that the Iranian Qods Force used this mockup to train the perpetrators of the attack and is further evidence of direct Iranian involvement.

Other incidents
20 January 2007 was the third-deadliest day of the Iraq War for U.S. troops, with 20 other U.S. soldiers killed throughout Iraq, including 12 in a helicopter crash caused by hostile ground fire north of Baghdad in Diyala Governorate.

See also

 Operation Greif
  Ahmed Kousay Altaie – A U.S. Army soldier who was captured by Iraqi insurgents and executed
  Wassef Ali Hassoun – A U.S. Marine who claimed to be captured by Iraqi insurgents; later discovered to be a hoax
 American POWs in the 2003 invasion of Iraq
 2004 Iraq KBR convoy ambush – Capture and execution of Keith Matthew Maupin, a U.S. Army soldier
 June 2006 abduction of U.S. soldiers in Iraq – Capture and execution of Kristian Menchaca and Thomas L. Tucker, two U.S. Army soldiers
 May 2007 abduction of U.S. soldiers in Iraq – Capture and execution of Alex Ramon Jimenez, Joseph John Anzack and Byron Wayne Fouty, three U.S. Army soldiers
 Joint Special Operations Command Task Force in the Iraq War

References

Battles of the Iraq War in 2007
Battles of the Iraq War involving Iraq
Iraqi insurgency (2003–2011)
Military operations involving Quds Force
Karbala
January 2007 events in Iraq